El Jaili is a power station located at Garri (80 km N of Khartoum), Sudan. The first unit was commissioned in 2003 and the last in 2007.

It is operated by the National Electricity Corporation of Sudan (NEC).

Garri4 is one of the thermal power plants connected to the national grid, with a total installed capacity of 110 MW (6.9 percent) of the country's total thermal electricity production. Sponge Coke, a byproduct of the Khartoum Refinery, is used to power this Power Plant Project.

See also

 List of power stations in Sudan

References

Renewable energy power stations in Sudan